A bearded lady (or bearded woman) is a woman with a naturally occurring beard normally due to the condition known as hirsutism or hypertrichosis. Hypertrichosis causes people of either sex to develop excess hair over their entire body (including the face), while hirsutism is restricted to females and only causes excessive hair growth in the nine body areas mentioned by Ferriman and Gallwey.

Background 
A relatively small number of women are able to grow enough facial hair to have a distinct beard. The condition is called hirsutism. It is usually the result of polycystic ovary syndrome which causes excess testosterone and an over-sensitivity to testosterone, thus (to a greater or lesser extent) results in male pattern hair growth, among other symptoms. In some cases, female beard growth is the result of a hormonal imbalance (usually androgen excess), or a rare genetic disorder known as hypertrichosis. In some cases a woman's ability to grow a beard can be due to hereditary reasons without anything medically being wrong.

There are numerous references to bearded women throughout the centuries, and William Shakespeare also mentioned them in Macbeth:

However, no known productions of Macbeth included bearded witches.

Sometimes it is caused by use of anabolic steroids. Cultural pressure leads most to remove it, as it may be viewed as a social stigma.

Race 
Charles Darwin's ideas on sexual selection that influenced the perception of women with excess facial hair were applied differently across race. Women of color who had excess facial hair were actually perceived as evidence of human's evolution from apes, whereas white women with excess facial hair were perceived as diseased. A beard on a white woman only challenged her sex, whereas a beard on women of color challenged her species.

Some famous bearded women were Krao Farini and Julia Pastrana.

Entertainment 
Notable examples were the famous bearded ladies of the circus sideshows of the 19th and early 20th centuries, such as Barnum's Josephine Clofullia and Ringling Bros.' Jane Barnell, whose anomalies were celebrated. Sometimes circus and carnival freak shows presented bearded ladies who were actually women with facial hairpieces or bearded men dressed as women, both practices being lampooned by comedian and former circus performer W.C. Fields in the 1939 film, You Can't Cheat an Honest Man.

Notable women with beards

8th century
 Iconography of the bearded Mary

12th century
Topographia Hibernica written by Gerald of Wales

14th century
Wilgefortis

16th century
Helena Antonia

17th century
 Magdalena Ventura, portrait by Jusepe de Ribera (1631)

19th century
Julia Pastrana
Krao Farini
Josephine Clofullia
Annie Jones
Alice Elizabeth Doherty ("The Minnesota Woolly Girl", 1887–1933)

20th century
Clémentine Delait (late 19th century and early 20th century)
Jane Barnell (late 19th century and early 20th century)
Jennifer Miller

21st century
Harnaam Kaur

Popular culture
Ethal Darling Kathy Bates's character in American Horror StoryLettie Lutz, Keala Settle's character in The Greatest Showman A fascination with Wilgefortis grips the narrator of Fifth Business, the 40th-best novel of the 20th century according to the Modern Library's readers' list.
 In the fictional country of Elbonia from the Dilbert'' comic strip, both men and women have beards and look identical.

See also 

 Ferriman–Gallwey score

References

External links 
 
How Facial Hair Influences Women's Everyday Experiences 
Solving the Mystery of the Bearded Lady
Bearded Lady Reunites With Long-Lost Son
'Bearded lady': I'm not a mistake
Harnaam Kaur on life as a bearded lady

Androgyny
 
Sideshow attractions